The Wake is the fourteenth studio album, and eighteenth release overall, by Canadian heavy metal band Voivod. The album was released on September 21, 2018 through Century Media Records.

The artwork was done by drummer Michel "Away" Langevin. It is also a concept album, and the first Voivod studio album to feature bassist Dominique "Rocky" Laroche, who replaced Jean-Yves "Blacky" Thériault in 2014. It was recorded and mixed by Francis Perron at RadicArt Recording Studio in Canada.

Background
In an interview with Metal Hammer about the musical style of the album, Langevin said:

Accolades

Track listing

Deluxe Edition bonus disc

Personnel
Michel "Away" Langevin – drums
Denis "Snake" Bélanger – vocals
Daniel "Chewy" Mongrain – guitar
Dominique “Rocky” Laroche – bass

Charts

Awards and nominations

References

2018 albums
Voivod (band) albums
Century Media Records albums
Concept albums
Juno Award for Heavy Metal Album of the Year albums